Matthew William Wagner (born April 4, 1972), is a former Major League Baseball pitcher who played in  with the Seattle Mariners. He batted and threw right-handed. Wagner had a 3-5 record, with a 6.86 ERA, in 15 games, in his one-year career. He was drafted by the Mariners in the 3rd round of the 1994 amateur draft.

External links

Baseball Almanac

1972 births
Living people
Seattle Mariners players
Major League Baseball pitchers
Baseball players from Iowa
Appleton Foxes players
Port City Roosters players
Tacoma Rainiers players
West Palm Beach Expos players
Jupiter Hammerheads players
New Jersey Jackals players
Allentown Ambassadors players
Pennsylvania Road Warriors players
Newark Bears players
Atlantic City Surf players
People from Cedar Falls, Iowa
Iowa State Cyclones baseball players
Long Island Ducks players